The Lonesome Trail is a 1955 American Western film starring Wayne Morris and John Agar.

It was made for Lippert Pictures.

Plot
A recently demobilized soldier's property and girl are taken from him by a greedy rancher whose henchmen have control over the town, but the ex-soldier plans a decisive showdown with his tormentors to right the wrongs.

External links
 
 The Lonesome Trail at TCMDB

1955 films
American Western (genre) films
1955 Western (genre) films
Lippert Pictures films
Films directed by Richard Bartlett
1950s English-language films
1950s American films
American black-and-white films